Apteronotus is a genus of weakly electric knifefish in the family Apteronotidae, distinguished by the presence of a tiny tail fin.  This genus is restricted to tropical and subtropical South America (Amazon, Orinoco, Río de la Plata and Magdalena basins, as well as rivers in western Colombia and the Guianas) and Panama where found in a wide range of freshwater habitats. They feed on small animals.

Members of Apteronotus fall into three species groups based on their morphology: the A. albifrons group have a rounded snout and are black or dark brown with a contrasting light stripe on the top of the head, and bands on the tail and at its base, the A. leptorhynchus group have an elongate, slender snout (especially in males) and are brown with a light stripe along the head and back, and a band on the tail, and the A. bonapartii group have an elongate (males) or rounded (females) snout and are brown or gray (capable of some color change) with a light band on the tail. The last group is not closely related to the first two and will likely need to be moved to another genus. A genetic study published in 2019 found that the genus is strongly polyphyletic with several groups that are quite distantly related.

Species
There are currently 27 recognized species in this genus:
 Apteronotus acidops Triques, 2011
 Apteronotus albifrons (Linnaeus, 1766) (Black ghost knifefish)
 Apteronotus anu de Santana & Vari, 2013
 Apteronotus apurensis Fernández-Yépez, 1968
 Apteronotus baniwa de Santana & Vari, 2013
 Apteronotus bonapartii (Castelnau, 1855)
 Apteronotus brasiliensis (J. T. Reinhardt, 1852)
 Apteronotus camposdapazi de Santana & Lehmann-A., 2006
 Apteronotus caudimaculosus de Santana, 2003
 Apteronotus cuchillejo (L. P. Schultz, 1949)
 Apteronotus cuchillo L. P. Schultz, 1949
 Apteronotus ellisi (Alonso de Arámburu, 1957)
 Apteronotus eschmeyeri de Santana, Maldenado-Ocampo, Severi & G. N. Mendes, 2004
 Apteronotus ferrarisi de Santana & Vari, 2013
 Apteronotus galvisi de Santana, Maldenado-Ocampo & Crampton, 2007
 Apteronotus jurubidae (Fowler, 1944)
 Apteronotus leptorhynchus (M. M. Ellis, 1912) (Brown ghost knifefish)
 Apteronotus lindalvae de Santana & Cox Fernandes, 2012
 Apteronotus macrolepis (Steindachner, 1881)
 Apteronotus macrostomus (Fowler, 1943)
 Apteronotus magdalenensis (Miles, 1945)
 Apteronotus magoi de Santana, Castillo G. & Taphorn, 2006
 Apteronotus mariae (C. H. Eigenmann & Fisher, 1914)
 Apteronotus milesi de Santana & Maldenado-Ocampo, 2005
 Apteronotus pemon de Santana & Vari, 2013
 Apteronotus rostratus (Meek & Hildebrand, 1913)
 Apteronotus spurrellii (Regan, 1914)

References 

Apteronotidae
Freshwater fish of South America
Taxa named by Bernard Germain de Lacépède
Freshwater fish genera